Walter Glaß (1905–1981) was a German skier. He was born in Klingenthal. He competed at the 1928 Winter Olympics in St. Moritz, where he placed 15th in Nordic combined.

References

1905 births
1981 deaths
German male Nordic combined skiers
Olympic Nordic combined skiers of Germany
Nordic combined skiers at the 1928 Winter Olympics
People from Klingenthal
Sportspeople from Saxony